Dunn State Park is a public recreation area surrounding a  pond in Gardner, Massachusetts.

History
The park's land was bequeathed to the city by furniture manufacturer John Ainsworth Dunn upon his death in 1915. The land was later transferred to the state.

Activities

Publicly guarded swimming area
Picnic area
Wheel Chair Accessible
Boating (non-motorized)
Pay-per-ride Paddle Boating
Boat Ramp
Canoeing
Fishing
Hiking
Skiing (Cross-Country)
Visitor's Center
Walking Trails
Ice Skating (sometimes)

Parking
Parking fees are in effect at Dunn State Park from Memorial weekend through Labor Day.

Car - $8 MA Vehicle, $30 non-MA Vehicle
Annual Pass - $60 Massachusetts Resident / $85 Out of State
Lifetime Senior MassParks Pass - $10
Vehicles bearing a HP plate or placard or Disabled Veterans plate, as well as Massachusetts seniors who are 62 years of age or more and have a Mass. Senior Citizen Pass from the DCR are allowed in free of charge as long as space is available

References

External links
Dunn State Park Department of Conservation and Recreation
Dunn State Park Trail Map Department of Conservation and Recreation

State parks of Massachusetts
Massachusetts natural resources
Parks in Worcester County, Massachusetts
Gardner, Massachusetts
1915 establishments in Massachusetts
Protected areas established in 1915